Shane Lust (born August 29, 1986) is a Canadian former ice hockey player.

Born in Calgary, Alberta, Lust attended SAIT Polytechnic where he played four seasons (2007 – 2011) of college hockey within the Alberta Colleges Athletics Conference. Following his graduation, Lust played two seasons with the Pingouins de Morzine-Avoriaz of the French Ligue Magnus, before signing with the Braehead Clan for the 2013–14 season.

Lust transferred from Braehead Clan to their Elite League Gardiner Conference rivals Dundee Stars on July 14, 2014. He then moved to the Southern Professional Hockey League with the Fayetteville FireAntz for the 2015–16, but only played four games for the team before retiring to become assistant coach of the Calgary Northstars, a midget level team.

References

External links

1986 births
Living people
Braehead Clan players
Calgary Royals players
Canadian ice hockey left wingers
Chilliwack Chiefs players
Dundee Stars players
Fort Saskatchewan Traders players
HC Morzine-Avoriaz players
Ice hockey people from Calgary
Canadian expatriate ice hockey players in Scotland
Canadian expatriate ice hockey players in France